Verilus pseudomicrolepis is a species of fish in the family Acropomatidae, the lanternbellies. It lives at a depth of approximately 200–600 metres and mainly inhabits the Caribbean Sea, reaching a length of around 14.5 centimetres.

References

pseudomicrolepis
Fish described in 1940